Tapinocyba is a genus of sheet weavers that was first described by Eugène Louis Simon in 1884.

Species
 it contains forty species and two subspecies, found in Europe, Asia, Canada, the United States, and Algeria:
Tapinocyba abetoneensis Wunderlich, 1980 – Italy
Tapinocyba affinis Lessert, 1907 – Europe
Tapinocyba a. orientalis Millidge, 1979 – Central Europe
Tapinocyba a. pyrenaea Millidge, 1979 – Spain, France
Tapinocyba algirica Bosmans, 2007 – Portugal, Algeria
Tapinocyba altimontana Tanasevitch, 2019 – Nepal
Tapinocyba anceps Denis, 1948 – France
Tapinocyba bicarinata (Emerton, 1913) – USA
Tapinocyba biscissa (O. Pickard-Cambridge, 1873) – Europe
Tapinocyba cameroni Dupérré & Paquin, 2007 – Canada
Tapinocyba corsica (Simon, 1884) – France (Corsica)
Tapinocyba dietrichi Crosby & Bishop, 1933 – USA
Tapinocyba discedens Denis, 1948 – France
Tapinocyba distincta (Banks, 1892) – USA
Tapinocyba emei Tanasevitch, 2018 – China
Tapinocyba emertoni Barrows & Ivie, 1942 – USA
Tapinocyba formosa Tanasevitch, 2011 – Taiwan
Tapinocyba gamma Chamberlin, 1949 – USA
Tapinocyba hortensis (Emerton, 1924) – USA
Tapinocyba insecta (L. Koch, 1869) – Europe
Tapinocyba kolymensis Eskov, 1989 – Russia, China
Tapinocyba latia Millidge, 1979 – Italy
Tapinocyba ligurica Thaler, 1976 – Italy, France
Tapinocyba lindrothi Hackman, 1954 – Canada
Tapinocyba lucana Millidge, 1979 – Italy
Tapinocyba maureri Thaler, 1991 – Switzerland, Italy
Tapinocyba minuta (Emerton, 1909) – USA, Canada
Tapinocyba mitis (O. Pickard-Cambridge, 1882) – Europe
Tapinocyba montivaga Tanasevitch, 2019 – Nepal
Tapinocyba pallens (O. Pickard-Cambridge, 1873) – Europe to Armenia
Tapinocyba parva Seo, 2018 – Korea
Tapinocyba pontis Chamberlin, 1949 – USA
Tapinocyba praecox (O. Pickard-Cambridge, 1873) (type) – Europe
Tapinocyba prima Dupérré & Paquin, 2005 – USA, Canada
Tapinocyba silvicultrix Saito, 1980 – Japan
Tapinocyba simplex (Emerton, 1882) – USA
Tapinocyba spoliatrix Tanasevitch, 1985 – Kyrgyzstan
Tapinocyba subula Seo, 2018 – Korea
Tapinocyba sucra Chamberlin, 1949 – USA
Tapinocyba suganamii Saito & Ono, 2001 – Japan
Tapinocyba ventosa Millidge, 1979 – France
Tapinocyba vermontis Chamberlin, 1949 – USA

See also
 List of Linyphiidae species (Q–Z)

References

Araneomorphae genera
Linyphiidae
Spiders of Africa
Spiders of Asia
Spiders of North America